Pedro Leopoldo Carrera  (19 June 1914 – 2 September 1963) was an Argentine carom billiards player and the first player to set a  of 1,000 or more. Carrera was a five time carom billiards world champion. He won the straight rail world championship in 1950 and 1953, the 47.2 balkline world championship in 1951, and the Union Internationale des Fédérations des Amateurs de Billard (UIFAB) World Three-cushion Championship in 1952 and UIFAB pentathlon world cup in 1954. In 1980, more than 17 years after his death, Carrera was awarded the Premios Konex in platinum posthumously as the best billiard player in Argentine history and also with the "Diploma al Mérito".

Championships 
Carrera won five world championships across various balkline and straight rail disciplines, and won 20 national championships:
 UMB World Three-cushion Championship: 1952
Pentathlon World Cup : 1954
Free game world championship : 1950, 1953
Cadre 47/2 World Championship : 1951
Three-Band Pan American Championships : 1950
Pan-American championships (5 championships)
Argentine championships (20 championships)

References

External links

  (in Spanish)
   - a biography about Carrera

Argentine sportspeople
1963 deaths
1914 births